Lewis and Clark, also known as the Lewis and Clark Expedition of 1804–1806 Memorial, is an outdoor 1934 white marble sculpture by Leo Friedlander installed outside the Oregon State Capitol in Salem, Oregon, United States.

Description and history

Leo Friedlander's Lewis and Clark (1934) is a high relief carving depicting Meriwether Lewis and William Clark of the Lewis and Clark Expedition on horseback, being led by Sacajawea, located outside the Oregon State Capitol's main entrance. The white Vermont marble sculpture, carved from a block made of six smaller pieces, measures approximately  x  x  and rests on a granite base that measures approximately  x  x . On the back is a map illustrating the area covered by Lewis and Clark and depictions of both hunting and meetings with Native Americans. The installation also includes a signed inscription that reads "" on the lower left and "" across the base.

The sculpture was surveyed and considered "well maintained" by the Smithsonian's "Save Outdoor Sculpture!" program in August 1993, and was administered by the Facilities Division of the Oregon Department of Administrative Services at that time.

See also
 1934 in art
 Captain William Clark Monument, University of Portland
 Coming of the White Man (1904), Portland, Oregon
 Lewis and Clark Memorial Column (1908), Portland, Oregon
 Meriwether Lewis and William Clark (1919 sculpture)
 Sacajawea and Jean-Baptiste (1905), Portland, Oregon
 Stone carving
 Stone sculpture

References

External links
 

1934 establishments in Oregon
1934 sculptures
Cultural depictions of Meriwether Lewis and William Clark
Cultural depictions of Sacagawea
Granite sculptures in Oregon
Horses in art
Marble sculptures in Oregon
Monuments and memorials in Salem, Oregon
Monuments and memorials to explorers
Outdoor sculptures in Salem, Oregon
Sculptures of Native Americans in Oregon